Meghraj Sharma Nepal (Nepali:मेघराज शर्मा नेपाल), popularly known by his pen-name Manjul (Nepali मञ्जुल) is a Nepalese singer, writer and poet. He was born in Falgun 2003 B.S.(1947 CE) in Bhojpur. His songs and poem deals with the social issues.

Personal life
After completing his school in Bhojpur, Manjul came to Dharan for higher studies where he met the musical group Sangeet Sangh Samuha and began to write lyrics for them. He learnt music from the same group. Manjul received his Bachelor in Arts degree in 1973.

In the 1960s, Manjul became part of a musical group called Ralpha as a songwriter as replacement of Ganesh Rashik. He travelled throughout Nepal with the group. The goal of the group was not only to perform, but had a political mission.
He became a committed communist worker, traveling from village to village with singer Raamesh, singing songs against Panchayat rule. Manjul later abandoned all cultural work and aimed to work for political parties.
He also works as professor of Nepali language at Bishwa Bhasa Campus.

Works

Awards
Some notable awards received by Manjul are listed below:
 Ambikadevi Puraskar 
 Rastriya Prativa Puraskar 
 Sajha Puraskar for Mrityu Kabita

References

Nepali-language writers
Living people
People from Bhojpur District, Nepal
1940s births
Sajha Puraskar winners